Lampeter is an unincorporated community and census-designated place (CDP) in West Lampeter Township, Lancaster County, Pennsylvania, United States. As of the 2010 census it had a population of 1,669. It is a suburb of Lancaster and has a ZIP code of 17537. The community was named after Lampeter, in Wales.

Geography
Lampeter is in central Lancaster County, in the eastern part of West Lampeter Township. It is bordered to the west by the Willow Street CDP. Pennsylvania Route 741 passes through the center of the community, leading east  to Strasburg. U.S. Route 222 forms the western edge of Lampeter, separating it from Willow Street; US 222 leads north into the center of Lancaster and southeast  to Quarryville.

The community drains north via Big Spring Run to Mill Creek, a tributary of the Conestoga River, and south via unnamed streams to Pequea Creek. Both the Conestoga River and Pequea Creek are tributaries of the Susquehanna River.

Demographics

Neighborhoods
Lampeter Village

Lampeter Village is in the Lampeter-Strasburg School District. It is one of the smallest neighborhoods in Lampeter, with its main road being Lampeter Road.

Pioneer Woods

Pioneer Woods is an apartment neighborhood located off Lampeter Road. Pioneer Woods is divided into two different sections. It has 1-, 2-, and 3-bedroom apartments, townhouses, and an office.

Applecroft

Applecroft is a middle class neighborhood in Lampeter off Lampeter Road.

Candlestick

Candlestick is a middle class neighborhood in Lampeter off Village Road.  The "Busted Bean Cafe" is located at the entrance of this neighborhood. The cafe opened in the spring of 2012.

Hunter's Ridge

Hunter's Ridge is located in a rural area. It is an upper-middle-class neighborhood far off from Lampeter Road.

Fire protection

One of the Lampeter Fire Department buildings is located in neighboring Willow Street.

The Lampeter Fire Station is and has been an all-volunteer fire company for over 96 years. Each year for three days in September, the Lampeter Fire Company hosts the Lampeter Fair, giving local residents a chance to exhibit animals, produce, and artwork. It is a fundraiser for the fire company and brings the larger community together.

References

Unincorporated communities in Lancaster County, Pennsylvania
Unincorporated communities in Pennsylvania
Census-designated places in Lancaster County, Pennsylvania